The Crooked Circle is a 1932 American pre-Code film, a comedy-mystery directed by H. Bruce Humberstone.

In 1933, The Crooked Circle was the first feature film shown on television. In Los Angeles, the Don Lee Broadcasting System showed the film on March 10, 1933, over their experimental station W6XAO, transmitting an 80-line resolution mechanical television picture to a half-dozen or fewer receiving sets in the greater Los Angeles area. The film was shown again on June 18, 1940 on the NBC Television experimental station WX2BS, now WNBC-TV in New York City.

Characters and story
Amateur detectives in the Sphinx Club are rivals of an evil gang known as The Crooked Circle. When a Sphinx tip leads to an arrest of a Crooked Circle member, they swear revenge on Sphinx member Colonel Theodore Walters (Berton Churchill). Nora Rafferty (ZaSu Pitts) complains to Old Dan (Christian Rub) about life in creepy Melody Manor.

Brand Osborne (Ben Lyon) intends to resign from the Sphinx Club, and his replacement is the Indian Yoganda (C. Henry Gordon), who proclaims, "Evil is on the way." When Rafferty sees Yoganda's turban, she says, "I'm sorry you got a headache, sir. Shall I get you a Bromo-Seltzer?" Policeman Arthur Crimmer (James Gleason) attempts to straighten out the confusion.

Cast
ZaSu Pitts as Nora Rafferty
James Gleason as Arthur Crimmer
Ben Lyon as Brand Osborne
Irene Purcell as Thelma Parker
C. Henry Gordon as Yoganda
Raymond Hatton as Harmon (The Hermit)
Roscoe Karns as Harry Carter
Berton Churchill as Col. Walters
Spencer Charters as Kinny
Robert Frazer as The Stranger
Ethel Clayton as Yvonne
Frank Reicher as Rankin
Christian Rub as Old Dan
Tom Kennedy as Mike, the policeman

See also
Party Girl, the first commercial comedy-drama feature film shown on the Internet

References

External links 

1932 films
American black-and-white films
Films directed by H. Bruce Humberstone
American comedy mystery films
1930s comedy mystery films
1932 comedy films
1930s English-language films
1930s American films